Pulsar is a steel launched shuttle roller coaster at Walibi Belgium in Wavre, Belgium. It opened on 4 June 2016 as the first PowerSplash model by German manufacturer Mack Rides.

Characteristics

The ride has two cars, each of which seats 20 riders in 5 rows of 4 riders each. The ride can accommodate a maximum of 950 riders per hour. The ride uses a turntable that enables one vehicle to be loaded while the other is running the course.

Ride experience
Once riders are loaded, the turntable station rotates to align the car with the rest of the track. The car then accelerates backward over a small hill before traveling through a straight section of track. This straight section of the track goes through the ride's splashdown pool, which at this point in the ride is low enough to allow the vehicle to pass over it. The car then travels part of the way up a vertical spike of the track before traveling forward over the hill. The car then launches forward into a second vertical spike and comes back down before entering a third backward launch. While the car is on the vertical spike at the back end of the ride's layout, the water flows into the splashdown pool in approximately six seconds raising the level. The car then travels down the spike and enters the splashdown pool, which is now filled with water. This serves to slow the car down before it re-enters the turntable to unload riders.

References

External links
Official website
Pulsar at Coaster-Net
 

Roller coasters introduced in 2016
Roller coasters in Belgium